Hertsa or Hertza is a city located in Chernivtsi Raion, Chernivtsi Oblast in western Ukraine. It hosts the administration of Hertsa urban hromada, one of the hromadas of Ukraine, and has a population of 

Until 2020, it was the  smallest raion administrative center in Ukraine.

History
Hertsa and the Hertsa region were part of the Moldavia historical region (administratively in Dorohoi County). In 1859, Moldavia united with Wallachia, forming the United Principalities of Moldavia and Walachia, which after the Romanian War of Independence, became the Kingdom of Romania, with Hertsa being incorporated into the Dorohoi County, and then into Ținutul Suceava. In June 1940, it was occupied by the Soviet Union together with Northern Bukovina and Bessarabia, although this territory was not mentioned in the Soviet ultimatum or in the Molotov-Ribbentrop Pact, being an integral part of the Old Kingdom. The Red Army also occupied this land, probably due to its strategic position over the city of Cernăuți and attached it to the Ukrainian SSR. The Romanian Army had liberated the region in June 1941, but in August 1944, USSR reoccupied it. 

Since 1962 until December 1991 Hertsa was part of Hlyboka Raion. Since the fall of the Soviet Union, it has been part of independent Ukraine. Until 18 July 2020, Hertsa served as an administrative center of Hertsa Raion. The raion was abolished in July 2020 as part of the administrative reform of Ukraine, which reduced the number of raions of Chernivtsi Oblast to three. The area of Hertsa Raion was merged into Chernivtsi Raion.

Demographics

In 1969 the population was 1500 people.

In January 1989 the population was 2360 people.

In January 2013 the population was 2122 people.

The town has a large Romanian (68.08%, 2001) community.

Natives
 Gheorghe Asachi
 Herman Finer
 Lucas Gridoux

Gallery

See also
Hertsa region
Dorohoi County

References

Cities in Chernivtsi Oblast
Cities of district significance in Ukraine